Rich Men, Single Women is a 1990 American made-for-television romantic comedy film directed by Elliot Silverstein.

Plot
Three women team up with the common goal of marrying millionaires.

Cast
Suzanne Somers as Paige
Heather Locklear as Tori
Deborah Adair as Susan
Joel Higgins as Nicky Loomis
Larry Wilcox as Mark
John Allen Nelson as Travis
James Karen

References

External links
Rich Men, Single Women at IMDb
Rich Men, Single Women at BFI
Rich Men, Single Women at TCMD

1990 television films
1990 films
1990 romantic comedy films
American television films
American romantic comedy films
Films directed by Elliot Silverstein
Films produced by Aaron Spelling
Films scored by Charles Fox
1990s American films